Aag Aur Chingari is a 1994 Hindi language action movie directed by Kanti Shah and starring Asrani, Shakti Kapoor, Paresh Rawal, Kiran Kumar and Ravi Kishan. Music of the film was done by Bappi Lahiri.

Cast
 Paresh Rawal
 Asrani
 Shakti Kapoor
 Kiran Kumar
 Ravi Kishan
 Sripradha

Soundtrack

References

External links

1990s Hindi-language films
1994 films
Films scored by Bappi Lahiri
Indian action films
Films directed by Kanti Shah